Robert Macpherson or MacPherson may refer to:
Robert Turnbull Macpherson (1814–1872), Scottish artist and photographer who worked in Rome
Robert George Macpherson (1866–1926), Canadian politician and pharmacist
Robert MacPherson (mathematician) (born 1944), American mathematician
Robert Macpherson (Canadian politician) (1853–1929), Canadian builder and politician
Robert MacPherson (BMX rider) (born 1971), American bicycle motocross (BMX) racer